Coustouges is a commune in the Pyrénées-Orientales department in southern France. Inhabitants are called Coustougiens (male) or Coustougiennes (female).

Geography

Localisation 
Coustouges is located in the canton of Le Canigou and in the arrondissement of Céret.

Coustouges is the second most southerly commune of mainland France, after Lamanère. The village is situated at an altitude of 832 m.

Toponymy 
Coustouges was previously recorded with the name Costogia in 936, Custajas or Costogia, and finally Coustouges (end of the 19th century).

History 
Coustouges was a dependency of the Abbey of Arles-sur-Tech from 988 until the French Revolution.

Population

Notable people 
 Francesc Sabaté Llopart (1915-1960), anarchist, anti-Francoist maquisard, spent several years in Coustouges
 François Pinault, French entrepreneur, bought a house there in September 2004.

Images

See also
Communes of the Pyrénées-Orientales department

References

External links
Official Coustouges website

Communes of Pyrénées-Orientales